The Society of Cardiovascular Computed Tomography is a United States-based medical specialty professional society in the field of X-ray computed tomography for the circulatory system.

Work
Founded in 2005, the Society of Cardiovascular Computed Tomography (SCCT) is the international professional society devoted exclusively to cardiovascular computed tomography (CCT), with members from over 60 countries. SCCT is a community of physicians, scientists and technologists advocating for research, education and clinical excellence in the use of CCT.

References

External links
 
 Journal of Cardiovascular Computed Tomography, published by the society

Circulatory system
X-ray computed tomography